Nicolás "Nico" Delmonte  (born 10 May 1989) is an Argentine footballer who plays for Zamora CF as a central defender.

Career
Delmonte was loaned to Albanian club Dinamo Tirana in 2009.

References

External links
 
 
 

1989 births
Living people
Sportspeople from Córdoba Province, Argentina
Argentine footballers
Association football defenders
Argentine Primera División players
Primera Nacional players
Club Atlético Independiente footballers
Instituto footballers
Club Sportivo Estudiantes players
Kategoria Superiore players
FK Dinamo Tirana players
Malaysia Premier League players
Johor Darul Ta'zim F.C. players
Segunda División B players
Marbella FC players
Extremadura UD footballers
CE Sabadell FC footballers
Zamora CF footballers
Bangladesh Football Premier League players
Bashundhara Kings players
Argentine expatriate footballers
Expatriate footballers in Albania
Expatriate footballers in Malaysia
Expatriate footballers in Spain
Expatriate footballers in Bangladesh
Argentine expatriate sportspeople in Albania
Argentine expatriate sportspeople in Malaysia
Argentine expatriate sportspeople in Spain
Argentine expatriate sportspeople in Bangladesh